Urasawa is a 2 Michelin Starred Japanese restaurant located in Beverly Hills, Los Angeles County, California run by head chef Hiroyuki Urasawa who used to work with Masa Takayama. As of 2018, the restaurant is considered the second most expensive in the world after Sublimotion at $1,111 per person.

Restaurant

The restaurant opened in 2003 taking the former location of Masa Takayama's restaurant Ginza Sushi-ko, after Takayama moved to New York and opened Masa in the Time Warner Center. 

Urasawa has a daily changing 30-course omakase menu.

Hiroyuki Urasawa
The head chef and owner Hiroyuki Urasawa's culinary journey started when he was young at his parents' restaurant in Shinjuku, Japan. After graduation of high school, he worked in Kyoto where he learned basic Yuusoku Ryori, Kyoto Style Tea Kaiseki at a 2 Michelin Starred Kaiseki Restaurant Mangamerou. After years, Urasawa moved to Los Angeles and became an apprentice of the former owner of Ginza Sushi-ko, Masa Takayama.

Legal issues
In 2013, Urasawa was ordered to pay nearly $70,000 in penalties and unpaid wages.  In 2016, another lawsuit alleged unpaid overtime wages and unfair treatment of a former sous chef.

See also
 List of sushi restaurants

References

Sushi restaurants in the United States
Michelin Guide starred restaurants in California
Restaurants established in 2003
Asian restaurants in Los Angeles
2003 establishments in California
Japanese restaurants in California